Praxithea beckeri is a species of beetle in the family Cerambycidae. It was described by Martins and Monné in 1980.

References

Torneutini
Beetles described in 1980